The 2008–09 season saw Dynamo Dresden return to national football, in the inaugural season of the 3. Liga. A new coach was appointed, veteran Eduard Geyer was replaced by Ruud Kaiser. The squad saw many changes too, with several experienced players leaving or retiring and a number of new players brought on.

Dynamo had the honour of playing the first match in 3. Liga history – a 1–0 win over Rot-Weiss Erfurt, with debutant Halil Savran scoring the new competition's first goal. Despite this, though, it was a largely disappointing season for the club – they spent much of the season in the bottom half of the table, before relatively decent end to the season saw them finish in tenth place.

Dynamo's reserve team had a very successful season. Coached by Dynamo's former Bundesliga player Matthias Maucksch, they won the Landesliga Sachsen (and promotion to the NOFV-Oberliga Süd and the Saxony Cup, a competition which the first-team were eliminated from in the first round.

Squad

Results

3. Liga

Saxony Cup

Transfers

References

External links
Season details at fussballdaten 

Dynamo Dresden seasons
Dynamo Dresden